The 2010 Toronto Argonauts season was the 53rd season for the team in the Canadian Football League and their 138th overall. The Argonauts improved upon their 3–15 record from 2009 and their 4–14 record from 2008 and qualified for the playoffs for the first time since 2007. After upsetting the Hamilton Tiger-Cats in the East Semi-Final, they were defeated in the East Final by the hosting Montreal Alouettes.

Offseason

CFL draft

Preseason

Regular season

Season standings

Season schedule 
 Win
 Loss
 Tie

Roster

Awards and records

2010 CFL All-Stars

CFL Eastern All-Stars
RB – Cory Boyd, CFL Eastern All-Star
OT – Rob Murphy, CFL Eastern All-Star
DT – Kevin Huntley, CFL Eastern All-Star
LB – Kevin Eiben, CFL Eastern All-Star
DB – Lin-J Shell, CFL Eastern All-Star
S – Willie Pile, CFL Eastern All-Star
ST – Chad Owens, CFL Eastern All-Star

Milestones

Playoffs

Schedule

Bracket

East Semi-Final

East Final

References

Toronto Argonauts seasons
Toronto Argonauts Season, 2010